Ruge Mutahaba (1970 – 26 February 2019) was a Tanzanian bureaucrat. He served as Director of Strategy and Programs Development at Clouds Media Group. In 2012 he had his first child Russell Mutahaba with Tanzanian presenter Zamaradi Mketema and in 2015 his second Koku Shubira Mutahaba.

Early life 
Mutahaba was born in Berkeley, California in 1970. On his return from the United States to Tanzania, Mutahaba attended primary school in Arusha from standard 1 to 6 and then attended Mlimani. He attended secondary school at Forodhani in Dar es Salaam for ordinary level education (O-level) and high school in Pugu for advanced level (A – Level) education. He earned a bachelor's degree in marketing and BA in finance at San Jose State University.

Career 
Mutahaba collaborated with his friend Joseph Kusaga, who was running Clouds Disco. Their collaboration led to the founding of Clouds Media Group in Arusha and later in Dar es Salaam. Clouds produces information and entertainment for young audiences that works to inspire and empower young Tanzanians to engage in finding entrepreneurial opportunities.

Death
According to some sources Mutahaba had kidney problems that sent him to South Africa to receive treatment, where he died on 26 February 2019.

Tanzanians, were shocked by his death and delivered condolence messages  due to Mutahaba's contribution to the media and entertainment sector, constructive strategic planning, the development of Tanzanian youths' talents, instillation of hard working spirit to the community and the development of the Tanzania in general. Over 100,000 people were estimated to have attended his funeral.

References

1970 births
2019 deaths
People from Brooklyn
San Jose State University alumni
Place of death missing